Sir John Scurrah Randles (25 December 1857 – 11 February 1945) was a British businessman and Conservative politician.

Biography
John Scurrah Randles was born on Christmas Day, 25 December 1857 in Boston, Lincolnshire, the son of a Wesleyan minister, Rev. Marshall Randles D.D (1826–1904) and Sarah Dewhurst. He was educated at the Woodhouse Grove School in Lincolnshire and lived at Bristowe Hill, Keswick, Cumbria. In 1883 Randles married Elizabeth Hartley (? - 1853). An industrialist in the coal and steel business, amongst his positions he was the chairman and managing director of the Moss Bay Hematite Iron and Steel Company and a director of the Workington Iron and the Beckermet Mining Companies. Randles was elected Member of Parliament for Cockermouth in the 1900 general election.

He lost the seat in the 1906 election, but regained it in a by-election later the same year. Defeated in the December 1910 election, he won Manchester North West in a 1912 by-election, and when the constituency was abolished, held Manchester Exchange until 1922, when he retired following the takeover by United Steel Companies of his Workington Iron and Steel Company.

Randles was knighted in 1905. A member of the executive of the National Trust, he gave land on the shores of Derwentwater to the Trust. He was also a member of Cumberland County Council and was active in setting up the Workington Technical College. He funded an operating theatre in his wife's name at Keswick Cottage Hospital. After the First World War, he was awarded the 'Insignia Commander of the Order of the Crown' medal by the King of the Belgians, 1919 and in 1920 Sir John was also awarded The Insignia of the Second Class of the Order of the Rising Sun.  Randles donated money to purchase land for the construction of Kingswood College in Kandy, Ceylon. He died at his home in Keswick in February 1945. He was survived by his wife Elizabeth.

References

 Obituary, The Times, 12 February 1945
 Hansard Bio with d.o.b.

External links 
 

1857 births
1945 deaths
Conservative Party (UK) MPs for English constituencies
Knights Bachelor
Members of Cumberland County Council
UK MPs 1900–1906
UK MPs 1906–1910
UK MPs 1910
UK MPs 1910–1918
UK MPs 1918–1922